Nawab Muzaffar Ali Khan Qizilbash was born in 1908. He was a Pakistani politician from the Punjab and a minister in the governments of the Punjab, West Pakistan and Pakistan. Muzaffar Qizilbash started his legislative career as a Unionist, later joining the Muslim League and subsequently the Republican Party. He later served as Minister for Industries in the cabinet of Prime Minister Ibrahim Ismail Chundrigar (Muslim League) from October 18, 1957 - December 16, 1957. Afterwards, he served as Minister for Industries, Commerce and Parliamentary Affairs in the cabinet of Prime Minister Feroz Khan Noon (Republican) from December 16, 1957 - March 18, 1958, when he was appointed Chief Minister of West Pakistan.

His successor as Minister for Industries and Commerce was Sardar Abdur Rashid Khan, the incumbent Chief Minister of West Pakistan, while the Parliamentary Affairs portfolio was assigned to Sardar Amir Azam Khan. Qizilbash was later Chief Minister of West Pakistan from March 1958 - October 7, 1958 when the cabinet was dismissed on the declaration of Martial Law by President Iskander Mirza.

After the fall of the Ayub Khan government, Qizilbash served as Finance Minister of Pakistan in the presidential cabinet of President and Chief Martial Law Administrator General Agha Muhammad Yahya Khan from August 4, 1969 - February 22, 1971. Shahtaj Qizilbash was the niece of Muzaffar Ali Khan Qizilbash. Nawab Muzaffar Ali Khan Qizilbash owned the historically significant Nisar Haveli in the Walled City of Lahore area for a while after the Independence of Pakistan in 1947.

References

Members of the Provincial Assembly of the Punjab
Pakistani republicans
Qizilbash, Nawab Muzaffar Ali Khan
Ambassadors of Pakistan to France
Chief Ministers of West Pakistan
1908 births
Year of death missing
Indian Knights Bachelor